In theoretical computer science, multiparty communication complexity is the study of communication complexity in the setting where there are more than 2 players.

 

Player P1 knows the value of x2, P2 knows the value of x1, but Pi does not know the value of xi, for i = 1, 2. 

In other words, the players know the other's variables, but not their own. The minimum number of bits that must be communicated by the players to compute f is the communication complexity of f, denoted by κ(f).

The multiparty communication game, defined in 1983, is a powerful generalization of the 2–party case: Here the players know all the others' input, except their own. Because of this property, sometimes this model is called "numbers on the forehead" model, since if the players were seated around a round table, each wearing their own input on the forehead, then every player would see all the others' input, except their own.

The formal definition is as follows:  players:  intend to compute a Boolean function 

 

The players have unlimited computational power, and they  communicate with the help of a blackboard, viewed by all players.

The aim is to compute ), such  that at the end of the computation, every player knows this value. The cost of the computation is the number of bits written onto the blackboard for the given input   and partition . The cost of a multiparty protocol is the maximum number of bits communicated for any  from the set {0,1}n and the given partition . The -party communication complexity,  of a function , with respect to partition , is the minimum of costs of those -party protocols which compute .

 

where the maximum is taken over all k-partitions of set .

 Upper and lower bounds 

For a general upper bound both for two and more players, let us suppose that A1 is one of the smallest classes  of the partition A1,A2,...,Ak. Then P1 can compute any Boolean function of S with |A1| + 1 bits of communication: P2 writes down the |A1| bits of A1 on the blackboard, P1 reads it, and computes and announces the value . So, the following can be written:

 

The Generalized Inner Product function (GIP) is defined as follows:
Let  be -bit vectors, and let  be the  times  matrix, with  columns as the  vectors. Then  is the number of the all-1 rows of matrix , taken modulo 2. In other words, if the vectors  correspond to the characteristic vectors of  subsets of an  element base-set, then GIP corresponds to the parity of the intersection of these  subsets.

It was shown that

 

with a constant c > 0.

An upper bound on the multiparty communication complexity of GIP shows that

 

with a constant c > 0.

For a general Boolean function f, one can bound the multiparty communication complexity of f by using its L''1 norm as follows:

Multiparty communication complexity and pseudorandom generators

A construction of a pseudorandom number generator was based on the BNS lower bound for the GIP function.

Applied mathematics
Information theory